

 
Thamarrurr is a locality in the Northern Territory of Australia located  south-west of the territorial capital of  Darwin.

Thamarrurr is named after the Thamarrurr Community Government Council which the locality covers. The locality's boundaries and name were gazetted on 4 April 2007.

The 2016 Australian census which was conducted in August 2016 reports that Thamarrurr had 197 people living within its boundaries.

Thamarrurr is located within the federal division of Lingiari, the territory electoral division of Daly and the local government area of the West Daly Region.

References

Populated places in the Northern Territory